Sunset Hills is a city in south St. Louis County, Missouri, United States. The population was 8,496 at the 2010 census.

Geography
Sunset Hills is located at 38°32'8" North, 90°24'14" West (38.535570, -90.403759).

According to U.S. Geological Survey, the highest point in Sunset Hills is 650 feet above sea level.

Demographics

2010 census
As of the 2010 United States census of 2010, there were 8,496 people, 3,424 households, and 2,422 families living in the city. The racial makeup of the city was 94.1% White, 2.3% Asian, 1.5% African American, 0.2% Native American, 0.4% from other races, and 1.4% from two or more races. Hispanic or Latino of any race were 1.6% of the population.

There were 3,424 households, of which 26.3% had children under the age of 18 living with them, 62.6% were married couples living together, 5.4% had a female householder with no husband present, 2.7% had a male householder with no wife present, and 29.3% were non-families. 25.8% of all households were made up of individuals, and 18.1% had someone living alone who was 65 years of age or older. The average household size was 2.39 and the average family size was 2.89.

The median age in the city was 50.3 years. 20.7% of residents were under the age of 18; 5.4% were between the ages of 18 and 24; 15.8% were from 25 to 44; 31.6% were from 45 to 64; and 26.5% were 65 years of age or older. The gender makeup of the city was 47.5% male and 52.5% female.

2000 census
As of the 2000 United States census, there were 8,267 people, 3,217 households, and 2,351 families living in the city. The racial makeup of the city was 96.27% White, 1.44% Asian, 1.08% African American, 0.13% Native American, 0.29% from other races, and 0.79% from two or more races. Hispanic or Latino of any race were 0.88% of the population.

There were 3,217 households, out of which 26.6% had children under the age of 18 living with them, 65.7% were married couples living together, 5.5% had a female householder with no husband present, and 26.9% were non-families. 24.2% of all households were made up of individuals, and 16.1% had someone living alone who was 65 years of age or older. The average household size was 2.46 and the average family size was 2.94.

In the city, the population was spread out, with 21.6% under the age of 18, 5.2% from 18 to 24, 19.8% from 25 to 44, 28.2% from 45 to 64, and 25.2% who were 65 years of age or older. The median age was 47 years. For every 100 females, there were 88.9 males. For every 100 females age 18 and over, there were 85.0 males.

The median income for a household in the city was $67,576, and the median income for a family was $90,417. Males had a median income of $60,869 versus $35,044 for females. The per capita income for the city was $40,151. About 2.0% of families and 3.1% of the population were below the poverty line, including 1.9% of those under age 18 and 5.0% of those age 65 or over.

1990 census
As of the 1990 United States census, the city had 4,915 residents; due to a series of annexations during the 1990s, the population grew to 7,885 by 1997.

History

Sunset Hills was incorporated in June 1957. In April 1973, it established its own Police Department, and in 1981, it purchased a landscaping service in order to establish the city's public works department.

Around noon on December 31, 2010, an EF3 tornado struck Sunset Hills, destroying several businesses and homes, killing one person, and injuring others in a three- to four-block area around Lindbergh Boulevard.

Economy
Panera Bread is headquartered in Sunset Hills.

Education
The Kirkwood School District and Lindbergh Schools school districts serve sections of the city. Their respective high schools are Kirkwood High School and Lindbergh High School.

Private schools include Thomas Jefferson School (St. Louis, Missouri), a boarding school for grades 7-12, and St. Justin the Martyr School, a Catholic school for kindergarten and grades 1–8.

Post-secondary colleges in Sunset Hills include Vatterott College.

Points of interest
Sunset Hills is home to Laumeier Sculpture Park, an outdoor sculpture garden. It has rotating indoor exhibitions and numerous large sculptures on the park grounds.

Community Center 

The Sunset Hills Community Center provides fitness and health services.  There are 20 pieces of cardio equipment including of treadmills, bikes, ellipticals, and striders. Two sections of free weights are available, from light weights and kettle bells to heavy weight dumbbells.  The Community Center has a gym and meeting rooms that can be used and rented by residents and non-residents.

Watson Trail Park 

At 12450 West Watson Road, is the City's largest park. Hours of park operation are dawn to dusk. Park amenities at Watson Trial Park includes the following:
1 Acre Lake
2 Picnic Sites
3 Picnic Shelters
3 Playgrounds
4 Tennis Courts
9 Hole Disc Golf Course
Aquatic Facility with 3 Pools
Basketball Court
Sand Volley Ball Court

Minnie Ha Ha Park 
The City opened Minnie Ha Ha Park in July 2005. It is located south of Highway 30 at the Meramec River and comprised the Minnie Ha Ha Beach that was popular in the 1930s. The picnic shelters are available for reservations. Park amenities include:
Walking Trails
3 playground areas
3 Picnic Shelters
Scenic overlook of the Meramec River
3 soccer fields

Kitun Dog Park 

The Cities of Sunset Hills and Crestwood came together to create a community dog park located in Sunset Hills near its border with neighboring Crestwood.  The Dog Park opened in July 2014 and is located inside of Kitun Park off of Eddie and Park Road.  Residents of both Sunset Hills and Crestwood can apply for a membership for their dogs for $40 per year.  Non-residents may also use the park for an annual fee of $55.  All questions and membership registrations should be directed to the City of Sunset Hills Parks & Recreation Department.
This new dog park will have a separate area for small dogs and large dogs and is open to residents and non-residents. Tags are available at the Sunset Hills Community Center located at
3915 S. Lindbergh Sunset Hills, MO 63127.

Athletic Complex 

The City of Sunset Hills provides six athletic fields for the community. Three lighted fields and one unlighted field are at 13555 West Watson Road. There are two unlighted soccer fields at 801 Old Gravois Road. The fields are used by our softball leagues, athletic associations, and tournaments and are also available for rent.

Political representation
Sunset Hills is represented by the following state and U.S. congressional members: 
In the Missouri House of Representatives, Sunset Hills, like Fenton, is part of District 96 and represented by Republican David Gregory;
In the Missouri Senate, it is part of District 15 and represented by Republican Andrew Koenig;
In the U.S. House of Representatives,  Sunset Hills is part of Missouri's 2nd congressional district and is represented by Republican Ann Wagner, the former United States Ambassador to Luxembourg

References

External links
City website

Cities in St. Louis County, Missouri
Cities in Missouri
1957 establishments in Missouri